Flammen (Flames) is an opera in two acts and ten scenes composed by Erwin Schulhoff, his only opera. The opera had its world premiere at the old National Theatre (Národní Divadlo na Veveří) in Brno on 27 January 1932 in Czech under the title Plameny. It was not heard again until the mid-1990s, when it was performed in its German translation by Max Brod as Flammen. Its story is a surrealist retelling of the Don Juan legend with elements from the legend of the Wandering Jew, and heavily influenced by Freudian psychology. Unlike the title character in Mozart's Don Giovanni based on the same legend, Don Juan is not punished by being dragged down to Hell, but instead is condemned to live forever.

Background and performance history

Not long after Schulhoff's return to Prague in 1923, he met Leoš Janáček's friend and biographer Max Brod, and discussed with him the possibility of writing an opera based on the Don Juan legend. Brod suggested that a new verse play by the Czech writer Karel Josef Beneš (1896–1969) might make a suitable basis for the libretto and introduced him to Beneš. Schulhoff and Beneš began work while Brod translated the text into German.

Schulhoff finished composing the opera in 1929. It premiered three years later at the Veveří National Theatre in Brno on 27 January 1932, performed in its Czech version as Plameny. Schulhoff's detailed stage directions called for sets with an "all-pervading darkness, punctuated by revealing shafts of light and colour". The scenography is echoed by a chorus of Shadows whose commentary makes frequent use of verbal images of colour and light. The premiere was a failure, and the opera never entered the repertory in Czechoslovakia. The rise of the Nazi Party in Germany and its campaign against so-called degenerate music (Entartete Musik) prevented the German premiere which was planned for  Berlin with Erich Kleiber conducting. Schulhoff's usual publisher, Universal Edition, did not accept the score for publication, and the opera was not performed again before Schulhoff's death from tuberculosis in the Wülzburg internment camp in 1942.

Interest in the work was revived at Leipzig Opera in 1995 conducted by Udo Zimmermann, performed as Flammen using Brod's German text, with some cuts in the music. Flammen was performed again in concert in May 2005 by Edo de Waart at Amsterdam's Concertgebouw. It had another staged revival, and its Austrian premiere, in 2006 at the KlangBogen Wien Festival. That production, directed by Keith Warner and conducted by Bertrand de Billy, opened on 7 August 2006 at the Theater an der Wien in Vienna. It was one of three operas based on the Don Juan legend presented by the festival that summer—the other two were Mozart's Don Giovanni and  Don Juan Returns from the War. In 2008, Flammen was revived again in Germany with a new production directed by Urs Häberli at the Pfalztheater in Kaiserslautern.

Roles
Although the roles of Donna Anna and Nun/Marguerite/Woman were sung by two separate sopranos in the 1932 premiere, a single soprano sang all these roles in the 1995 Decca recording and in the 2006 staged production in Vienna.

Synopsis
The opera is not a straight narrative, but rather a loosely connected set of ten scenes, each with its own name. Don Juan is in love with Death personified by La Morte, the only woman he has not been able to seduce. The Shadows (six women) function as a Greek chorus, commenting on the action and on Don Juan's past life.

Act 1
Scene 1 Nocturne
The Shadows sing of Don Juan's sexual exploits and La Morte's passion for him. To the sound of a solo flute, he enters a dark abandoned house to seduce yet another woman. Her moans of ecstasy are heard.

Scene 2 Fire Song
The Shadows sing of a woman whose desire for Don Juan is so great that she imagines his body to be the colour of fire.

Scene 3 Midnight Mass
Determined to reform his libertine ways, Don Juan enters a church for Midnight Mass but is seduced by a nun. La Morte plays a Gloria on the organ while the sound of foxtrot music is heard outside.

Scene 4 Chimera
Don Juan climbs a mountain of naked female bodies. At the summit he finds La Morte waiting for him.

Scene 5 Gallery
Don Juan enters a sculpture gallery filled with statues of men. The men are his dead ancestors, who unlike him managed to find happiness.

Scene 6 Dialogue
Don Juan talks to a woman, the same one who had previously appeared as a nun. Their dialogue is interrupted when Don Juan has a vision of another woman whose body is the colour of fire.

Scene 7 Tempest and Dialogue with the sea
Marguerite and Don Juan make love during a storm. La Morte appears and kills Marguerite. Don Juan stands before the sea and tells of his longing for death.

Act 2
Scene 8 Carnival Night
It is Carnival Night. Amidst a troupe of commedia dell'arte mimes, Don Juan and Donna Anna dance a foxtrot. Arlecchino foretells scenes of horror which will occur at midnight. Donna Anna rejects Don Juan's advances telling him "You are the very image of death." He then murders Donna Anna's husband, the Commendatore, and she commits suicide.

Scene 9 Banquet
Don Juan tries in vain to revive Donna Anna as a group of naked women begin dancing around him. Unable to stop them, he cries out to La Morte expressing his desire for her. She tells him that he will be closer to her as a living man rather than a dead one. The Commendatore then pronounces a curse on Don Juan, condemning him to live forever. On hearing the curse, Don Juan shoots himself, but instead of dying is turned into an even younger man.

Scene 10 Nocturne
Doomed to desperately repeating the cycle of his life over and over again, Don Juan enters the same darkened house where the opera began, accompanied by the same solo flute, to seduce yet another victim. La Morte and the Shadows lurk in the darkness singing, with the final words of the opera given to La Morte: "Salvation is so distant—again".

Recordings

Notes and references

Sources
Ambrosius, Claus (2008). "Lohnende Prüfung – Kaiserslautern, Schulhoff: Flammen". Opernwelt, June 2008, p. 44. Accessed 29 January 2011. 
Bek, Josef (2001). "Schulhoff, Erwin [Ervín]", Grove Music Online. Accessed 29 January 2011. . (Online version of The New Grove Dictionary of Music and Musicians, 2nd edition. )
Black, Leo (1995). "The Return of the Repressed", The Musical Times, Vol. 136, No. 1827, May 1995, pp. 230–232. Accessed 29 January 2011.  
 
Davis, Peter G. (1997). "Hear No Evil". New York (June 9, 1997) pp. 82–83.
Eagleton, Michael (2007). "Review: Erwin Schulhoff: Flammen, KlangBogen, Wien 7 August 2006", Journal of the International Centre for Suppressed Music, Jewish Music Institute, SOAS, February 14, 2007. Accessed 29 January 2011.
Gelli, Piero and Poletti, Filippo eds. (2007). "Flammen", Dizionario dell'opera. Baldini Castoldi Dalai.  
Oliver, Michael (1996). "Review: Schulhoff: Flammen (Decca 444630). Gramophone, January 1996, p. 108. Accessed 29 January 2011.
Seckerson, Edward and Johnson, Stephen (1995). "Review: Schulhoff: Flammen (Decca 444630). The Independent, October 27, 1995. Accessed 29 January 2011. 

Operas
1932 operas
Czech-language operas
German-language operas
Compositions by Erwin Schulhoff
Works based on the Don Juan legend